Herbert Lytton Cress (December 9, 1897 – June 26, 1981) was an American film and television actor. He was known for playing Admiral Reynolds in the American sitcom television series McHale's Navy.

Lytton was born in Falmouth, Kentucky. In 1937 he made his film debut in Stolen Holiday, playing the uncredited role of a fashion show photographer. He then appeared in the films Captain America and The Black Parachute, and played the role of Chuck Johnson in the 1950 film Champagne for Caesar. He later guest-starred in television programs including Gunsmoke, Bonanza, Tombstone Territory, Wagon Train, 77 Sunset Strip, Tales of Wells Fargo, Perry Mason, The Twilight Zone, The Deputy and Voyage to the Bottom of the Sea. Lytton also appeared and co-starred in films such as Marshal of Cedar Rock, Behind the High Wall, Mission Over Korea, The Gallant Hours, The Glass Web, Man of a Thousand Faces and The Cosmic Man (as General Knowland).

Lytton died in June 1981 in Las Cruces, New Mexico, at the age of 83.

References

External links 

Rotten Tomatoes profile

1897 births
1981 deaths
People from Pendleton County, Kentucky
Male actors from Kentucky
American male film actors
American male television actors
20th-century American male actors